Hugo Andrés Alarcón Abarzúa (11 January 1993 – 11 January 2019) was a Chilean footballer who played as a striker for football club Deportes Iberia.

Club career 
Alarcón made his debut at Universidad Católica in 2013 against Palestino which ended in a 0–0 draw.
In July 2014 he went on loan to Deportes La Pintana for one year.

Death 
Alarcón died on 11 January 2019, his 26th birthday.

References

External links 

1993 births
2019 deaths
Chilean footballers
Club Deportivo Universidad Católica footballers
Association football forwards